"Let Go" is a song by British rapper and songwriter Central Cee. It was released as a single on 15 December 2022. The song samples "Let Her Go" (2012) by English singer-songwriter Passenger.

Background and release
On 8 December 2022, the rapper took to TikTok to ask his followers if they approved of a clip of the song. The snippet quickly went viral across the app. The song was described as flipping the original message of the song it samples and turning it into an outlet for his desires after his girlfriend left Cee.

Critical reception
Aron A. of HotNewHipHop opined that all involved turned the original song into a "velvety drill banger" that showcases "Cee's vulnerability", as well as a "more melodic style" than usual. Jack Lynch at Hypebeast wrote that the song sees the rapper tapping "into his current love affairs", while simulateneously giving "wider love advice for his audience". Raphael Helfand of The Fader thought the chorus was "more befitting" than his previous hit single "Doja". James Keith of Complex noticed the productional changes. While the "808 slides and hi-hat triplets" are still present, the rapper traded his "punchiness and bravado" for a "kind of stark, candid rhyming".

Music video
The music video was released on 15 December 2022 and was shot at Alexandra Palace in London on 22 November 2022, right before his "Still Loading" concert at the venue. It was directed by long-term collaborator Kunography.

Charts

Certifications

References

2022 singles
2022 songs
Central Cee songs
Number-one singles in Portugal
SNEP Top Singles number-one singles
Songs written by Central Cee